Alcohol companies are sponsors of major association football teams and tournaments. Branding has been voluntarily removed from children's replica kits and banned outright in France. Alcohol cannot be consumed in parts of English football grounds with view of the pitch, or anywhere in Scottish grounds outside of corporate hospitality.

In England, football had a drinking culture, which declined from the late 1990s due to foreign managers such as Arsène Wenger and an increased focus on health and fitness. Some star footballers have suffered from alcohol abuse up to the point of death, and others have committed alcohol-related crimes such as drink driving. Conversely, other players abstain from alcohol, including for reasons of faith.

Alcohol and players

English football had a drinking culture as could seen by the example of Arsenal's Tuesday Club. One of the first managers to challenge this and promote the health and performance benefits of abstinence was Frenchman Arsène Wenger, who was hired by Arsenal in 1996. In 2016, he said that there was no longer a drinking culture in English football as players were aware of the risks.

Players who died due to chronic alcohol abuse include Northern Irishman George Best (59) and Brazilian Garrincha (49). Players who had long-term issues with alcohol include Tony Adams, Paul Merson, Paul Gascoigne, Gary Charles, Jimmy Greaves and Brian Clough. Footballers convicted of drink driving include Yaya Touré, Wayne Rooney, Craig Bellamy, Charlie Adam and Hugo Lloris.

Muslim footballers do not consume alcohol and celebrations have been altered to avoid exposing them to alcohol. Notable non-Muslim footballers who abstain from alcohol include Cristiano Ronaldo, Gareth Bale, Jermain Defoe and Harry Kane.

Alcohol and fans
In 1985, the consumption of alcohol in the stands of English football grounds and stadium areas with views of the pitch was banned in order to curb hooliganism. This applies in the highest five tiers (Premier League to National League). In 2021, former sports minister Tracey Crouch considered changes to this rule, believing that it encouraged fans to drink quickly at half time. The idea was criticised by Mark Roberts, the police's leader on football.

Alcohol has been banned from any parts of Scottish football grounds since unrest at the 1980 Scottish Cup Final between Celtic and Rangers, excluding corporate hospitality areas. There was talk on revoking this ban for UEFA Euro 2020, which was opposed by the police.

Sponsorship

English football clubs sponsored by alcohol include Liverpool with Carlsberg (1992–2010), Newcastle United by Scottish & Newcastle (1980–2000), and Everton by Chang Beer (2004–2017). By the 2017–18 season, there were no longer any alcohol sponsors on shirts in the Premier League for the first time, as gambling companies predominated. In Scotland, rivals Celtic and Rangers shared Carling (2003–2010) and Tennent's (2010–2013) as sponsors before moving onto Magners and Blackthorn Cider, respectively. 

English tournaments sponsored by alcohol include the Premier League by Carling (1993–2001), the FA Cup by Budweiser (2011–2014), and the EFL Cup by Worthington's (1998–2003) and Carling (2003–2012). In Scotland, such tournaments include the Scottish Cup by Tennent's (1989–2007) and the Scottish Football League by Bell's whisky (1994–1998; 1999–2006)

In June 2007, the Portman Group, representing Britain's drinks industry, voluntarily agreed to remove alcohol sponsors from replica kits for children. Owing to concerns about alcohol, Carling removed their branding from children's Celtic and Rangers kits in 2008 ahead of a Scottish legal ban on alcohol adverts appearing on children's kits which came into force in 2009.

Since the passing of the Loi Évin in 1991, it is illegal in France to use sponsorship to promote alcohol. For this reason, visiting foreign teams have to remove alcohol branding from their kits. There exists a loophole by which the branding of alcohol companies is permitted if it is explicitly promoting a low-alcohol beer with an ABV of under 1.2%; Carlsberg was able to sponsor UEFA Euro 2016 in France for this reason. At UEFA Euro 2020, French player Paul Pogba removed a sponsored bottle of non-alcoholic Heineken during a press conference; organisers then said they would no longer place beer bottles around Muslims such as Pogba.

In June 2019, North America's Major League Soccer allowed jersey and stadium sponsorship by liquor and gambling companies. As of November 2020, the only Central American countries banning the advertising of alcohol in sport were Costa Rica and Panama. A bill in Costa Rica then passed its first reading, prescribing a 6% tax on alcohol sponsorships, and ensuring that 20% of advertising fees would be spent on building and maintaining sports facilities.

In 2012, Spain banned sponsorship of alcohol with an ABV of 20% or higher, in sport. The compromise was due to breweries investing heavily in the game, including investment at grassroots level: in 2017 they invested €60 million, with sponsorships potentially doubling or trebling that amount.

See also
Smoking in association football

References

Alcohol
Alcohol
Alcohol
Sponsorships
Drinking culture